Perryville is a town in Cecil County, Maryland, United States. The population was 4,361 at the 2010 census. The town is located near an access for Interstate 95, on the north side of the outlet of the Susquehanna River.

History
Perryville was first settled by Europeans in 1622, when Edward Palmer was granted a patent for a settlement on what is now Garrett Island. During the 17th century, Lord Baltimore granted George Talbot  of land, which included the Perryville area. Before incorporation (1882), the settlement was known as Lower Ferry (circa 1695), Susquehanna (circa 18th century), and was finally named Perryville after Mary Perry, the wife of John Bateman.

During the Revolutionary War, Perryville served as a staging area for the Continental Army. Colonel John Rodgers (1728–1791), who operated the ferry and tavern in Perryville, raised the 5th Company of the Maryland Militia. This company became part of the famous Flying Camp and was instrumental during the early stages of the Revolutionary War. George Washington stopped frequently at Rodgers Tavern on his travels from Virginia to New York. Rodgers Tavern was listed on the National Register of Historic Places during 1972. Colonel Rodgers' son, John Rodgers, was instrumental in suppressing the Tripolitan pirates in the Mediterranean Sea and was subsequently promoted to Commodore of the Mediterranean Squadron. Commodore Rodgers served with distinction during the War of 1812 and is known as the "Father of the American Navy."

During the 19th century, Perryville was the midway station for the Wilmington to Baltimore Rail Line. During the American Civil War, the railway line between Perryville and Baltimore was destroyed. To transport troops and munitions to Annapolis, the Union Army again began the operation of the ferry across the Susquehanna. The Principio Furnace is located nearby and was listed on the National Register of Historic Places in 1972.

During the 20th century, it was an important destination for those going to the United States Naval Training Center Bainbridge, Maryland, about three miles up the road, now no longer functioning and sold by the Navy. Perryville continued to serve as a railroad town. The interstate highway system, with access near Perryville, brought business from highway travelers.

Perryville is currently home to the Perry Point Veteran's Medical Center, located on a picturesque campus at the outlet of the Susquehanna River into Chesapeake Bay. This same location is also the Northeast Campus of AmeriCorps National Civilian Community Corps, a residential national service program which recruits young Americans between the ages of 18 to 24 to perform community service in various locations in the country.

Perryville is the northern terminus of the MARC Penn Line commuter rail service, which runs south to Washington, D.C. via Baltimore. The 1905-built station also serves as a railroad museum and an Amtrak maintenance facility.

Perryville is home to the largest linwood tree in Maryland, located at 50 Millcreek Road on an estate known formerly as the Anchorage. Perryville is also home to numerous historical sites including the Principio Furnace.

Geography
Perryville is located at  (39.569662, −76.068725).

Demographics

2010 census
As of the census of 2010, there were 4,361 people, 1,762 households, and 1,130 families living in the town. The racial makeup of the town was 84.6% White, 9.6% African American, 0.4% Native American, 1.3% Asian, 0.1% Pacific Islander, 1.0% from other races, and 2.9% from two or more races. Hispanic or Latino of any race were 4.2% of the population.

There were 1,762 households, of which 32.2% had children under the age of 18 living with them, 48.0% were married couples living together, 11.9% had a female householder with no husband present, 4.3% had a male householder with no wife present, and 35.9% were non-families. 30.6% of all households were made up of individuals, and 11.5% had someone living alone who was 65 years of age or older. The average household size was 2.46 and the average family size was 3.07.

The median age in the town was 40.7 years. 23.4% of residents were under the age of 18; 7.9% were between the ages of 18 and 24; 25.1% were from 25 to 44; 30.9% were from 45 to 64; and 12.6% were 65 years of age or older. The gender makeup of the town was 49.7% male and 50.3% female.

2000 census
As of the census of 2000, there were 3,672 people, 1,443 households, and 988 families living in the town. The racial makeup of the town was 90.93% Caucasian, 5.86% African American, 0.27% Native American, 0.76% Asian, 0.54% from other races, and 1.63% from two or more races. Hispanic or Latino of any race were 2.31% of the population.

There were 1,443 households, out of which 35.1% had children under the age of 18 living with them, 51.6% were married couples living together, 11.9% had a female householder with no husband present, and 31.5% were non-families. 27.3% of all households were made up of individuals, and 10.8% had someone living alone who was 65 years of age or older. The average household size was 2.52 and the average family size was 3.05.

In the town, the population was spread out agewise with 27.2% under the age of 18, 6.4% from 18 to 24, 32.5% from 25 to 44, 22.9% from 45 to 64, and 11.0% who were 65 years of age or older. The median age was 36 years. For every 100 females, there were 94.6 males. For every 100 females age 18 and over, there were 93.0 males.

The median income for a household in the town was $43,984, and the median income for a family was $52,981. Males had a median income of $39,112 versus $28,526 for females. The per capita income for the town was $20,040. About 6.0% of families and 7.8% of the population were below the poverty line, including 5.8% of those under age 18 and 21.8% of those age 65 or over.

Economy
The town is home to one of IKEA's distribution centers, which houses one of the largest rooftop solar arrays in the U.S., and the largest in the state of Maryland. The distribution center’s total 4.9-MW solar installation of 25,913 panels generates 6,092,533 kWh of clean electricity yearly.

In 2010 Perryville opened the first legal casino in Maryland (Hollywood Casino Perryville). The casino is near the southbound exit of I-95. It offers slot machines, video gaming, table games, and a poker room area. The revenues from the casino are divided with the Town of Perryville and Cecil County government as well as the state.

In 2018, it was announced that Great Wolf Resorts would open a new Great Wolf Lodge in Perryville.

Infrastructure

Transportation

The main mode of transportation to Perryville is by road. Interstate 95 crosses the north edge of town, with an interchange at Maryland Route 222 providing direct access. U.S. Route 40 also traverses the town. The northern terminus of MARC's Penn Line commuter rail service to Baltimore and Washington, D.C. is at the Perryville station in Perryville. Cecil Transit provides bus service to Perryville along the Route 2 Cross-County Connection to North East and Elkton.

Library

A new Perryville Branch of the Cecil County Public Library was opened in 2008.

Schools
There are four schools within Perryville's limits.  Perryville Elementary, Middle and High Schools are public.  The school sports mascot of Perryville High School is the panther. There is also one private school, a Catholic K-8 school named Good Shepherd.  It is affiliated with the Roman Catholic Church of the same name.

Churches
The following are the six churches in Perryville:  Blythedale Seventh-day Adventist Church, First Baptist Church of Perryville, Good Shepherd Catholic Church, Perryville Presbyterian Church, Perryville United Methodist Church, and St. Mark's Episcopal Church.

Notable people 
Jim Keesey (1902–1951), professional baseball player born in Perryville
John Rodgers (1772–1838), naval officer born in Perryville 
John Chew Thomas (1764–1836), politician born in Perryville

References

External links

Town Hall
Chamber of Commerce

 
Towns in Maryland
Towns in Cecil County, Maryland
Maryland populated places on the Chesapeake Bay